JS2, JS-2, or variation, may refer to:

 JS 9 mm (CS/LS2) 9mm pistol
 JS-2 heavy tank, Josef Stalin 2 Soviet WWII tank
 Ligier JS2, 1970s mid-engined sports coupe from Ligier
 ECMAscript 2.0 (JS2.0), JavaScript standard, see JavaScript
 JScript 2.0 (MS JS 2.0), Microsft Javascript variant, see JScript

See also
 WinJS 2.0, Windows Library for JavaScript
 J2S, French software company
 JS (disambiguation)
 JSS (disambiguation)